Salo or Salò may refer to:

Places

Finland 
Salo, Finland, a town in Western Finland
Salo sub-region, a subdivision of Finland Proper and one of the Sub-regions of Finland since 2009
An old name of Saloinen, a former municipality in Ostrobothnia

Other places 
Salò, a town in Lombardy, Italy
Salò Republic or Italian Social Republic, a puppet state of Nazi Germany
Salò, a 1975 film by Paolo Pasolini
Salo Township, Aitkin County, Minnesota, a township in Minnesota, U.S.
Salo, Latin name for the modern Jalón (river) in Spain

People
Salo (surname)
Salo (given name)
Salo (footballer) (born 1998), Portuguese footballer

Other
Salo (food), salted unrendered pork fat, popular in Eastern Europe
Salo (instrument), a Thai musical instrument
Salò, or the 120 Days of Sodom, a film by Pier Paolo Pasolini
Salo, a character in The Sirens of Titan by Kurt Vonnegut